"Discipline of Love" is a song by English rock singer Robert Palmer. It was released as a lead single from his eight studio album, Riptide (1985).

Critical reception
On its release, Roger Morton of Record Mirror wrote, "Slabs of hollow, rattling bass, punctuated by raunchy guitars and shots of brass leaves little room for Robert's vocal subtleties. Too much chant, and not enough chart."

Charts

References

External links
 

1985 singles
Robert Palmer (singer) songs
Song recordings produced by Bernard Edwards
1985 songs
Island Records singles
Songs written by David Batteau